Bulbophyllum sect. Brachyantha is a section of the genus Bulbophyllum.

Description
Species in this section are epiphytic with two or more flowers with 4 pollina

Distribution
Plants from this section are found in Southeast Asia.

Species
Bulbophyllum section  Brachyantha comprises the following species:

References

Orchid subgenera